eMusic Session EP is an album by American singer-songwriter Chan Marshall published in 2006 by Matador Records exclusively for the eMusic online music store. The recording is an edited portion of Marshall's appearance on KCRW's Morning Becomes Eclectic broadcast in June 2006. It includes two songs from Marshall's previous albums The Greatest and You Are Free as well as two previously unreleased cover songs.

Track listing

References

External links 

eMusic Session EP by Cat Power at eMusic

2006 EPs
Cat Power albums